The 1991 Benson & Hedges Cup was the twentieth edition of cricket's Benson & Hedges Cup.

The competition was won by Worcestershire County Cricket Club.

Fixtures and results

Group stage

Group A

Source:

Group B

Source:

Group C

Source:

Group D

Source:

Quarter-finals

Semi-finals

Final

See also
Benson & Hedges Cup

References

Benson & Hedges Cup seasons
1991 in English cricket